Perry Township is one of the fourteen townships of Pike County, Ohio, United States.  The 2000 census found 913 people in the township.

Geography
Located in the northwestern corner of the county, it borders the following townships:
Paxton Township, Ross County - north
Benton Township - east
Mifflin Township - southeast
Brushcreek Township, Highland County - west
Paint Township, Highland County - northwest

No municipalities are located in Perry Township, although the unincorporated community of Cynthiana lies in the northwestern part of the township.

Name and history
It is one of twenty-six Perry Townships statewide.

Government
The township is governed by a three-member board of trustees, who are elected in November of odd-numbered years to a four-year term beginning on the following January 1. Two are elected in the year after the presidential election and one is elected in the year before it. There is also an elected township fiscal officer, who serves a four-year term beginning on April 1 of the year after the election, which is held in November of the year before the presidential election. Vacancies in the fiscal officership or on the board of trustees are filled by the remaining trustees.

References

External links
Pike County visitors bureau website

Townships in Pike County, Ohio
Townships in Ohio